Guyana competed in the 2010 Commonwealth Games, held in Delhi, India, from 3 to 14 October 2010. It sent 34 players, and won one silver medal, won by Aliann Pompey in the 400-meter run.

Medalists

Athletics

Boxing 

Men

Rugby sevens

Swimming

Women

Squash

Individual

See also
 2010 Commonwealth Games

References

Nations at the 2010 Commonwealth Games
Guyana at the Commonwealth Games
Common